The Königssee is a natural lake in the southeast Berchtesgadener Land district of the German state of Bavaria, near the Austrian border. Most of the lake is within the Berchtesgaden National Park.

Description
Situated within the Berchtesgaden Alps in the municipality of Schönau am Königsee, just south of Berchtesgaden and the Austrian city of Salzburg, the Königssee is Germany's third deepest lake. Located at a Jurassic rift, it was formed by glaciers during the last ice age.

The literal translation of the name, Königssee, appears to be "king's lake"; however while  does indeed mean "king", there had been no Bavarian kings since the days of Louis the German until Elector Maximilian I Joseph assumed the royal title in 1806. Therefore, the name more probably stems from the first name Kuno of local nobles, who appear in several historical sources referring to the donation of the Berchtesgaden Provostry in the twelfth century; the lake was formerly called Kunigsee.

The Königssee Railway (Königsseebahn) served the lake from 1909 until 1966. Its last tracks were dismantled during 1971, and the former station of the Königssee Railway in Berchtesgaden (Königsseer Bahnhof) was demolished in 2012. The only remaining element of the railway is the Königsee station, which is now a restaurant. The track route is mostly used as a walking path.

In 1944, a sub-camp of the Dachau concentration camp was built nearby, located near a residence Heinrich Himmler had built at Schönau for his mistress Hedwig Potthast.

The lake is noted for its clear water and is advertised as the cleanest lake in Germany. For this reason, only electric-powered passenger ships, rowing, and pedal boats have been permitted on the lake since 1909. Passenger services along the length of the lake are operated by the Bayerische Seenschifffahrt company and call at Seelände (Schönau), St. Bartholomä, Salet (mid-April to mid-October), and Kessel (on request). In ideal conditions, the longest tour takes two hours from Seelände to Salet. Swimming is permitted except in the lock area at Seelände.

Due to its picturesque setting, the lake and surrounding parklands are very popular with tourists and hikers. In addition, the surrounding sheer rock walls create an echo known for its clarity. On boat tours, it has become traditional to stop and play a flugelhorn or trumpet to demonstrate the echo. Previously demonstrated by shooting a cannon, the echo can be heard to reverberate up to seven times. The trumpeter plays along with the echo, so that there can seem to be as many as seven players.

St. Bartholomä, a famous pilgrimage church with an inn nearby, is located on a peninsula about halfway down the western lake shore. The small Christlieger island is located near its northern end. Because there is no lakeside path on the steep shore of the Königssee, St. Bartholomä and the southern edge can only be reached by boat, or via hiking trails up the surrounding mountains, except during harsh winters when the lake freezes over. Stepping on the ice, however, can be fatal, as it was for a motorist who drowned in his Volkswagen Beetle on the way back from St. Bartholomä in January 1964.

See also
Königssee bobsleigh, luge, and skeleton track

References

External links
 
 

Lakes of Bavaria
Mountain lakes
Berchtesgaden Alps
Berchtesgadener Land
LKonigssee